Žan Žužek (born 26 January 1997) is a Slovenian footballer who plays for Italian  side Bari as a centre-back.

Club career
On 23 August 2022, Žužek signed a three-year contract with Bari in Italy.

References

External links
NZS profile 

1997 births
Living people
Footballers from Ljubljana
Slovenian footballers
Association football defenders
Association football midfielders
NK Domžale players
FC Koper players
S.S.C. Bari players
Slovenian PrvaLiga players
Slovenian Second League players
Serie B players
Slovenian expatriate footballers
Slovenian expatriate sportspeople in Italy
Expatriate footballers in Italy
Slovenia youth international footballers
Slovenia under-21 international footballers